Mysia may refer to:

 Mysia,  an ancient region in northwest Anatolia
 Mysia, Victoria, a town in Australia
 Mysia the layers of connective tissue in muscles

See also

 Misia (disambiguation)